A bare-metal stent is a stent made of thin, uncoated (bare) metal wire that has been formed into a mesh-like tube. The first stents licensed for use in cardiac arteries were bare metal – often 316L stainless steel. More recent "second generation" bare-metal stents have been made of cobalt chromium alloy.  While plastic stents were first used to treat gastrointestinal conditions of the esophagus, gastroduodenum, biliary ducts, and colon, bare-metal stent advancements led to their use for these conditions starting in the 1990s.

Drug-eluting stents are often preferred over bare-metal stents because the latter carry a higher risk of restenosis, the growth of tissue into the stent resulting in vessel narrowing.

Examples 
 Stainless steel: R stent (OrbusNeich), Genous Bio-engineered R stent (OrbusNeich), (J&J, Cordis) BxVelocity, (Medtronic) Express2, Matrix Stent (Sahajanand Medical technologies)
 Cobalt-chromium alloy: Vision (Abbott Vascular); MP35N Driver stent (Medtronic)
 Platinum chromium alloy: Omega BMS (Boston Scientific)

See also 
 Angioplasty
 Coronary stent
 Percutaneous coronary intervention

References 

Implants (medicine)
Interventional cardiology